Mark Yurevich Starostin (born December 23, 1990) is a  Kazakhstani cross-country skier who has competed since 2012 till 2016.

Early years
Starostin was 3–4 years old when he tried to ski for the first time, and the first competition he took part in was opening of the winter season of Akmola Province. He studied in the 4th grade then. Starostin trained at the Specialized school of perfect sport mastery of Astana. He became a professional under coaching his father, Yuri, who is honored sportsmen of the Soviet Union.

References

External links
 

1990 births
Cross-country skiers at the 2014 Winter Olympics
Kazakhstani male cross-country skiers
Living people
Olympic cross-country skiers of Kazakhstan
Universiade medalists in cross-country skiing
Sportspeople from Astana
Universiade gold medalists for Kazakhstan
Universiade silver medalists for Kazakhstan
Competitors at the 2013 Winter Universiade
Competitors at the 2015 Winter Universiade
21st-century Kazakhstani people